Mary Elizabeth Kissel is former Senior Advisor to U.S. Secretary of State Mike Pompeo. Previously, she was a member of The Wall Street Journal editorial board in New York City, and editorial page editor of The Wall Street Journal Asia,  based in Hong Kong. She is currently Executive Vice President and Senior Policy Advisor at Stephens Inc.

Early life and education
Kissel was born in south Florida and is a graduate of the Dreyfoos School of the Arts. She received a bachelor's degree in government from Harvard University, where she studied under Russian historian Richard Pipes. She was well known on campus as a marimba virtuosa, and performed with the Harvard-Radcliffe Orchestra and Harvard College Opera. She later earned a Master’s Degree from Johns Hopkins University's Paul H. Nitze School of Advanced International Studies, studying at the university's Bologna, Italy and Washington DC campuses.

Professional career
Kissel served from October 2018 to January 2021 as Senior Advisor to Secretary Pompeo, where she developed a reputation for her hawkish stance on U.S.-China policy. She advocated for China's persecuted Uyghurs, supported the Hong Kong democracy movement, and pushed for closer U.S. ties to Taiwan. She also worked closely with Harvard Law School professor Mary Ann Glendon to launch the Secretary's Commission on Unalienable Rights.

Immediately prior to her State Department appointment, Kissel served as a member of The Wall Street Journal editorial board in New York City, where she was chief foreign affairs writer for the newspaper's "Review & Outlook" column. She hosted the Journal's popular "Foreign Edition" podcast on foreign policy, where she interviewed and debated guests ranging from the late Secretary of State George Shultz to former National Security Advisor John Bolton. She also served as a Fox News contributor from 2017 to 2018, appearing as a regular panelist on The Journal Editorial Report, Sunday Morning Futures and Mornings With Maria. On Thursday evenings, Kissel co-hosted The John Batchelor Show, a nationally syndicated talk show.

Kissel started her career as a fixed income research and capital markets analyst at Goldman Sachs in New York City and London.

She joined The Wall Street Journal Asia in Hong Kong in 2004 as a foreign correspondent, and contributed to the Money & Investing section’s Heard in Asia column. From 2005 to 2010, she served as editorial-page editor, responsible for the newspaper's commentary on the Asia-Pacific region. In that role, she traveled widely, profiling the Dalai Lama, Japanese Prime Minister Shinzo Abe, South Korean President Lee Myung-bak, and Malaysian Prime Minister Anwar Ibrahim, among others. She warned against Beijing's military build-up in the Pacific and the Party's repression of Hong Kong's freedoms.

Kissel has also written for the Far Eastern Economic Review, The Spectator, Le Spectacle du Monde, and World Affairs and appeared on television networks and podcasts around the world, including ABC News, CNN, Fox News, Fox Business, MSNBC, RTHK, and Sky News. Her radio appearances include ABC Radio, Fox News Radio, Radio National and the Larry Kudlow Show, among others.

Affiliations 
Kissel was a 2006 Claremont Institute Lincoln Fellow and a Hoover Institution Edwards Media Fellow in 2012 and 2016. She is a life member of the Council on Foreign Relations and host of The Nixon Seminar on Conservative Realism and National Security.

References

External links
  Archive at WSJ.com

Living people
Journalists from Florida
Harvard University alumni
Paul H. Nitze School of Advanced International Studies alumni
Goldman Sachs people
American women journalists
The Wall Street Journal people
Year of birth missing (living people)